Let It Roll is the eighth studio album by the American rock band Little Feat, released in 1988. Eight of the ten songs on the album were co-written by new band member Craig Fuller, the founding member of Pure Prairie League. Fuller also takes most lead vocals. The album attained RIAA certified gold status on February 14, 1989. It is the first Little Feat studio album without Lowell George, after his death in 1979 and is one of their most successful albums, sparking a comeback by the band. The first single, "Hate to Lose Your Lovin'", earned the band their first #1 hit on the Mainstream Rock Tracks chart.

Reception 
Reviewing the album for AllMusic, Stephen Thomas Erlewine, said:
What's surprising about Let It Roll is not just that it works, but that it works smashingly. It sounds as if the group picked up after The Last Record Album, deciding to return to the sound of Feats Don't Fail Me Now. True, the songwriting might not have the idiosyncratic genius of George, but it's strong, catchy and memorable, from the fine singles "Hate to Lose Your Lovin'" and "Let it Roll" to album tracks. More importantly, the band sounds lively and playful - Little Feat hasn't sounded this good in the studio since Feats, so it's easy to see why the members wanted to regroup. Yes, George is missed - it's hard not to miss such a gifted songwriter and musician - but Let It Roll isn't disrespectful of his memory, it keeps his music alive, which is the greatest compliment it can be paid.

Track listing

Charts

Personnel
Source:

Band members
Paul Barrère – guitar, vocals
Sam Clayton – percussion, vocals
Craig Fuller – vocals, button accordion and sometimes guitar (first album with group)
Kenny Gradney – bass guitar
Richie Hayward – drums, vocals
Bill Payne – keyboards, vocals
Fred Tackett – guitar, mandolin, trumpet (first album as group member)

Additional personnel
Renée Armand – vocals
Marilyn Martin – vocals
Shaun Murphy – vocals (joined band 1993)
Bonnie Raitt – vocals
Linda Ronstadt – vocals
Bob Seger – vocals

Production 
George Massenburg and Bill Payne – Producers
George Massenburg – Recording and Mix Engineer
Sharon Rice and Kenny Fowler – Assistant Engineers
Ivy Skoff – Production Coordinator
Edd Kolakowski – Piano Technician

Album cover design
Neon Park

References

External links
 - provided by SME (on behalf of Volcano); ASCAP, ARESA; -  featuring Shaun Murphy (vocal)
 - provided by Warner Music Group
 - provided by Warner Music Group

1988 albums
Little Feat albums
Albums produced by Bill Payne
Albums produced by George Massenburg
Warner Records albums
Albums with cover art by Neon Park